Lotto–Dstny is a Belgian professional cycling team at UCI ProTeam level sponsored by the Belgian lottery and Dstny, a business communications provider. The same organisations also sponsor a women's cycling team, .

History

Sponsorship

Lotto has a long history of cycling sponsorship, they began sponsoring 1984 with Tönissteiner–Lotto–Mavic–Pecotex. In 1985, it became prime sponsor of a team bearing only its name. Walter Godefroot and Patrick Lefevere were early directeurs sportifs. The fusion of the Lotto–Adecco and Domo–Farm Frites teams for the start of the 2003 season created the current team and structure in the guise of Lotto–Domo.

Omega Pharma had previously been a co-sponsor of the Quick-Step–Davitamon team in 2003 and 2004. Omega Pharma became the main sponsors in 2005, under their Davitamon brand name. The team name switched to Omega Pharma's Predictor brand name in 2007 and the Silence brand in 2008. From 2010 the team became known as Omega Pharma–Lotto, but this sponsor moved their financial support to the  setup for the 2012 season.

Belisol became co-sponsors in 2012, and are a Belgian company making windows and doors and solar panels.

On the final day of the 2014 Tour de France the team announced that they had secured new sponsorship for the team with Soudal, manufacturers of sealants, adhesives and foams. Soudal signed a deal lasting six seasons, the team name becoming Lotto Soudal: in 2019, they extended the deal for two more years.  Lotto continue to sponsor the team, as well as the women's team and under-23 team.

For one stage race each year since 2016 (at the 2016 Paris–Nice, 2017 Paris–Nice, 2018 Giro d'Italia, and 2019 Tour de Pologne), the team raced under the name Lotto Fix ALL and changed the team kit to a grey colour to reflect one of Soudal's key brands.

Tour Status

 was a member team of the UCI World Tour from its inception in 2009 until the end of the 2022 season. The team was relegated from the World Tour at the end of 2022 after finishing 19th in the points standings for the 2020 - 2022 qualification cycle. The top 18 teams qualified for the 2023 - 2025 cycle, meaning that from 2023 the team will drop down a division and race under a UCI ProTeam licence. Among non-World Tour teams, Lotto finished first in the 2022 one-year points list ahead of TotalEnergies, meaning it receives wildcards for all 2023 World Tour stage and one-day races.

Current team structure
The team is managed by Marc Sergeant and Bill Olivier and they are assisted by Herman Frison, Jean-Pierre Heynderickx, Bart Leysen, Marc Wauters, Mario Aerts and Michiel Elijzen.

After Tosh Van der Sande accidentally listed the wrong nasal spray brand in the paperwork at the 2018 Six Days of Ghent where he returned a positive test for prednisolone, a substance found in the nasal spray Sofrasolone, he was temporarily suspended by the team. Van der Sande was later cleared of any wrongdoing by the UCI.

Team roster

Major wins

National champions

1985
 Belgian Road Race, Paul Haghedooren
1986
 Belgian Road Race, Marc Sergeant
1988
 Belgian Track (Individual Pursuit), Benjamin Van Itterbeeck
1990
 Belgian Road Race, Claude Criquielion
1992
 Belgian Road Race, Johan Museeuw
1995
 Belgian Road Race, Wilfried Nelissen
2000
 Belgian Time Trial, Rik Verbrugghe
2002
 Australian Road Race, Robbie McEwen
 Dutch Road Race, Stefan van Dijk
2005
 Australian Road Race, Robbie McEwen
 Belgian Road Race, Serge Baguet
 Dutch Road Race, Léon van Bon
2007
 Belgian Time Trial, Leif Hoste
2008
 Australian Road Race, Matthew Lloyd
 Belgian Road Race, Jürgen Roelandts
2009
 World Road Race, Cadel Evans
2011
 Belgian Road Race, Philippe Gilbert
 Belgian Time Trial, Philippe Gilbert
2013
 German Road Race, André Greipel
2014
 German Road Race, André Greipel
 Belgian Road Race, Jens Debusschere
2015
 Belgian Time Trial, Jurgen van den Broeck
2016
 German Road Race, André Greipel
2018
 Belgian Time Trial, Victor Campenaerts

Notes

References

External links

 
UCI WorldTeams
Cycling teams based in Belgium
Cycling teams established in 1985
1985 establishments in Belgium